The  was an infantry division of the Imperial Japanese Army. It was formed on 2 February 1942 at Shanghai as a security (class C) division, simultaneously with 58th and 59th Divisions. The nucleus for the formation was the 11th Independent Mixed Brigade. As a security division, the 60th Division's backbone consisted of independent infantry battalions, and it did not include an artillery regiment. Its men were drafted from Sakura. The division was permanently assigned to the 13th Army.

Action
Upon formation, the 60th Division assumed the security duties of the 11th Independent Mixed Brigade. The division's area responsibility stretched from Shanghai to Suzhou. On 10 August 1944, the 89th Independent Mixed Brigade was split from the 60th Division in Jinhua. The 60th Division was still building fortification in the area in anticipation of an Allied landing at Shanghai, until the surrender of Japan 15 August 1945. 

Afterward, the 60th Division embarked ships in Shanghai and returned to Sasebo and Fukuoka. The 60th Division dissolution was complete 6 June 1946.

See also
 List of Japanese Infantry Divisions
 Independent Mixed Brigades (Imperial Japanese Army)

Notes and references

This article incorporates material from Japanese Wikipedia page 第60師団 (日本軍), accessed 13 June 2016
 Madej, W. Victor. Japanese Armed Forces Order of Battle, 1937-1945 [2 vols]
Allentown, PA: 1981

Japanese World War II divisions
Infantry divisions of Japan
Military units and formations established in 1942
Military units and formations disestablished in 1945
1942 establishments in Japan
1945 disestablishments in Japan